Sechin Banet is a village (near Otligam village) in tehsil Beerwah of district Budgam of the Jammu and Kashmir.

References 

Villages in Budgam district